Cerutti is an Italian surname. Notable people with such a surname include:

Alison Cerutti (born 1985), Brazilian beach volleyball player
Carlos Cerutti (1969–1990), Argentine basketball player
David Cerutti (born 1974), Argentine football player
Dominique Cerutti (born 1961), French businessman
Fabio Cerutti (born 1985), Italian athlete

Giuseppe Cerutti (1738–1792), French-Italian author and politician
Guillaume Cerutti (born 1966), French civil servant and businessman, CEO of Christie's
John Cerutti (1960–2004), American baseball pitcher and television analyst
Marziale Cerutti (1895–1946), Italian general
Susana Ruiz Cerutti (born 1940), Argentine politician
Vincent Cerutti (born 1981), French radio and television presenter

See also

Cerutti Mastodon site
Ceruti
Cerruti (disambiguation)
Cerruti